Asadtala Binode Vidyapith(informally ABV) is a Higher Secondary School in the Purba Medinipur district of West Bengal state, located in the area Asadtala of Nandigram. PIN Code is 721656.  It has classes from lower 5th to 12th grade level. The institution conducts its classes as per the W.B.B.S.E (West Bengal Board of Secondary Education) & W.B.C.H.S.E. (West Bengal Council of Higher Secondary Education). The school was established in the year 1912. It is an over 100 years school. School result is very good.

History

External links
ABV on Facebook

High schools and secondary schools in West Bengal
Schools in Purba Medinipur district
Educational institutions established in 1912
1912 establishments in India